The 2009 BWF World Championships was the 17th tournament of the World Badminton Championships. It was held at the Gachibowli Indoor Stadium in Hyderabad, Telangana, India, from 10 to 16 August, 2009. Following the results of the men's singles.

Seeds

 Lee Chong Wei (quarter-final)
 Chen Jin (final)
 Peter Gade (quarter-final)
 Taufik Hidayat (semi-final)
 Lin Dan (champion)
 Sony Dwi Kuncoro (semi-final)
 Joachim Persson (first round)
 Park Sung-hwan (second round)
 Hsieh Yu-hsing (third round)
 Chan Yan Kit (third round)
 Bao Chunlai (first round)
 Wong Choong Hann (third round)
 Simon Santoso (quarter-final)
 Nguyen Tien Minh (third round)
 Chetan Anand (third round)
 Boonsak Ponsana (third round)

Main stage

Section 1

Section 2

Section 3

Section 4

Final stage

External links 
Results

Men's singles